Natasha Zvereva and Rick Leach were the defending champions but only Leach competed that year, with Rennae Stubbs.

Stubbs and Leach lost in the first round to Rene Simpson and Daniel Nestor.

Larisa Neiland and Mark Woodforde won in the final 4–6, 7–5, 6–0 against Nicole Arendt and Luke Jensen.

Seeds
Champion seeds are indicated in bold text while text in italics indicates the round in which those seeds were eliminated.

Draw

Final

Top half

Bottom half

References
 1996 Australian Open – Doubles draws and results at the International Tennis Federation

Australian Open - Mixed Doubles
Mixed Doubles
Australian Open (tennis) by year – Mixed doubles